Simona Halep was the defending champion, but did not compete this year.

Kristina Mladenovic won the tournament, defeating Daria Gavrilova in the final 6–3, 6–2.

Seeds

Draw

Finals

Top half

Section 1

Section 2

Bottom half

Section 3

Section 4

External links 
 Main draw

Girls' Singles
French Open, 2009 Girls' Singles